Harun "Aaron" Kimathi Rimbui (born 15 October 1979) is a Kenyan pianist, keyboardist, bandleader, producer, festival curator and radio host. He is regarded as one of East Africa's finest pianists.

Biography
Aaron was born in Nairobi, Kenya. Rimbui's ear for music was displayed while still a toddler. His father would play everything from Stevie Wonder records to Henry Mancini and take him to local restaurants where he heard the music of groups like Les Wanyika, Maroon Commandos and Samba Mapangala. This had a significant influence on how he developed his sound in later years. Rimbui's individual expression in music continued to form in his high school years. It is at this time that he picked up the piano. Rimbui began to gravitate toward jazz as he listened to the music of David Sanborn, Joe Sample, Yellowjackets and Fourplay and later, Herbie Hancock and George Duke. Rimbui served as head the Tusker Project Fame band.

Professional career
Rimbui started his career as music director playing for Eric Wainaina He then recorded his first album Keys Of Life. Rimbui then began his festival outings with Jahazi Jazz Festival and later Dar Jazz Event Rimbui recorded his sophomore record Alfajiri Rimbui continued his festival performances at Safaricom Jazz Festival  and Winter Jazz Festival Copenhagen 
In 2016, Rimbui released his third record Deeper
Rimbui also began a series of concerts titled All That Jazz which has featured to date Sauti Sol  Eric Wainaina, Maurice Kirya  and Moussa Diallo
Rimbui with Eric Wainaina composed the theme music and score for the television series Tinga Tinga Tales.

Discography
 2005 Keys Of Life
 2009 Alfajiri
2016 Deeper
 2017 Kwetu

References

Kenyan musicians
Living people
1979 births